Vita Club Mokanda, formerly  Victoria Club Mokanda, is a football club based in Pointe-Noire, Republic of the Congo. They play in the Congo Premier League. In 1971 the team has won the Congo Premier League.

Stadium
Currently the team plays at the 13500 capacity Stade Municipal de Pointe-Noire.

Honours
Congo Premier League: 3
 1971, 1998, 1999.

Coupe du Congo: 4
 1974, 1977, 1996, 1997.

Super Coupe du Congo: 0

Performance in CAF competitions
CAF Champions League: 1appearance
1971 African Cup of Champions Clubs

References

Football clubs in the Republic of the Congo
Pointe-Noire
Association football clubs established in 1952
1952 establishments in the French colonial empire